João Paulo Queiroz de Moraes (born 28 November 1996), known as João Paulo, is a Brazilian professional footballer who plays for as a forward.

Club career

São Paulo
Born in Tietê, São Paulo, João Paulo graduated from the youth academy of local São Paulo FC.  He went on to score seven goals in the 2015 Copa São Paulo de Futebol Júnior, one goal shy of the top scorer Gabriel Vasconcelos. Amidst interest from Palmeiras, Fluminense and Corinthians, he extended his contract till 2019 on 21 February.

Ahead of the 2015 season, João Paulo was promoted to the senior team. On 23 May, he made his professional debut, coming on as a substitute for Michel Bastos in a 3–0 win against Joinville.

On 7 July 2016, João Paulo was loaned out to Bahia till May 2017. On 3 March 2017, he scored his first professional goal, in a 3–0 win against Altos in the season's Copa do Nordeste.  On 2 June, his loan was extended until the end of the season.

On 27 December 2017, João Paulo was loaned out to Criciúma for the season . He went on to score two goals in the Campeonato Catarinense. On 13 April 2018, he scored his first Série B goal for the club in a 3–2 defeat against Atlético Goianiense.

Ceará
On 30 December 2018, João Paulo joined Ceará for the upcoming season.

Career statistics

References

External links

1996 births
Living people
Association football forwards
Brazilian footballers
Campeonato Brasileiro Série A players
Campeonato Brasileiro Série B players
São Paulo FC players
Esporte Clube Bahia players
Criciúma Esporte Clube players
Ceará Sporting Club players
Oeste Futebol Clube players